The 1972 Florida State Seminoles football team represented Florida State University in the 1972 NCAA University Division football season. The Seminoles began the season ranked #19 in the AP poll and rose to #13 (#20, #17, #16, #13 in the second through fifth weeks respectively) before falling out completely following their loss to Florida. They entered again at #17 after their victory against Colorado State, but dropped out again after the loss at Auburn.

Schedule

Roster
QB #19 Gary Huff, Sr.

References

Florida State
Florida State Seminoles football seasons
Florida State Seminoles football